The 1965 European Amateur Team Championship took place 23–27 June at Royal St George's Golf Club in Sandwich, Kent, England and at nearby Royal Cinque Ports in Deal. It was the fourth men's golf European Amateur Team Championship.

Venue 

Royal St George's Golf Club was founded in 1887 and had previously hosted The Open Championship nine times, but not since 1949. It came back to the Open Championship rotation in 1981. For the 1965 European Amateur Team Championship, the course was set up with par 70 over 6,742 yards. The teams in flights A, B and C played their matches at Royal St George's, while the teams in flights D and E played their matches at Royal Cinque Ports.

Format 
All participating teams played two qualification rounds of stroke-play, counting the four best scores out of up to six players for each team. The four best teams formed flight A, the next four teams formed flight B, the next three teams formed flight C, the next three teams formed flight D and the last three teams formed flight E.

The standings in each flight was determined by a round-robin system. All teams in the flight met each other and the team with most points for team matches in flight A won the tournament, using the scale, win=2 points, halved=1 point, lose=0 points. In each match between two nation teams, three foursome games and six single games were played. Teams were allowed to switch players during the team matches and select other players in to the afternoon single games after the morning foursome games.

Teams 
17 nation teams contested the event. Each team consisted of a minimum of six players.

Players in the leading teams

Other participating teams

Sources:

Winners 
Team Ireland, making its first appearance in the championship, won the gold medal, earning 4 points in flight A. Scotland took the silver medal, also on 4 team match points, but with lesser won game points. Defending champion and host country England earned the bronze on third place.

Individual leader in the first round of the opening 36-hole stroke-play qualifying competition was Michael Bonallack, England, with a score of 1-under-par 69. Iestyn Tucker, Wales, shot the only under par score in the second round, also scoring 69. The total individual honor belonged to Michael Bonallack, with a 7-over-par score of 147 over 36 holes, but there was no official award for the lowest individual score.

Results 
Qualification rounds

Team standings

* Note: In the event of a tie the order was determined by the better non-counting score.

Individual leaders

 Note: There was no official award for the lowest individual score.

Flight A

Team matches

Team standings

Flight B

Team matches

Team standings

Flight C

Team standings

Flight D

Team standings

Flight E

Team standings

Final standings

Sources:

See also 

 Eisenhower Trophy – biennial world amateur team golf championship for men organized by the International Golf Federation.
 European Ladies' Team Championship – European amateur team golf championship for women organised by the European Golf Association.

References

External links 
European Golf Association: Full results

European Amateur Team Championship
Golf tournaments in England
European Amateur Team Championship
European Amateur Team Championship
European Amateur Team Championship